Kennedy Mansion (Valley Forge), also known as Kennedy-Supplee Mansion, is an Italian-villa-style residence within Valley Forge National Historical Park. Now squeezed between PA Route 23 and U.S. Route 422 (Pottstown Expressway), it once overlooked the 19th-century industrial village of Port Kennedy.

Port Kennedy was named for Alexander Kennedy, a major figure in the American lime industry. Limestone was quarried from the Valley Forge hills and processed into lime, which was shipped on the Schuylkill Canal and, after 1849, on the Reading Railroad. The 1852 mansion and 1845 Port Kennedy Presbyterian Church, now on opposite sides of a highway, a former hotel and train station are all that is left of the village.

Summary from the Historic American Buildings Survey:
When John Kennedy built this mansion in 1852, it was the focal point of Port Kennedy Village. A fine example of the Italian Villa Style, it retains many of its exterior and interior features. The first floor rooms, large and well-proportioned, still possess their elegant details and the door and window enframements, which narrow, reflect the Egyptian Revival Style. The elaborate plaster ceiling decorations in the principal rooms are superb. They represent the ultimate in craftsmanship in a now almost lost art. Surrounding the main block of the house is a graceful porch with a concave roof supported by cast-iron trellises in a grapevine-and-morning-glory design. A balcony ornaments the second-floor facade of the tower.
The mansion sits on a knoll, which originally overlooked the community and is one of the few structures to survive the decline of the lime and blast furnaces in the area.

John Kennedy was born in 1815, the youngest of Alexander Kennedy's eight children. In 1842 he purchased the lime works at Port Kennedy, and built one of the extensive lime productions in the area. The lime industry and Kennedy flourished during Kennedy's lifetime. The village also included a three-story hotel, a blast furnace with stone house and workshops, a Reading Railroad station, and the Presbyterian Church, a handsome stone structure built in 1845.

John Kennedy died in 1877. His widow remained in the house until her death. Six owners followed. Additions were made to the house ca. 1920, and about 1950. The structure was remodeled into apartments. The National Park Service acquired the property in 1978. The Kennedy Mansion is located in Valley Forge National Historical Park.

From 1911 to 1936, the mansion was owned by J. Henderson Supplee, at the time of his death, one of the last Civil War veterans in Montgomery County. It later served as the Port Kennedy Inn, and a boardinghouse. U.S. Route 422 (Pottstown Expressway) was constructed through the property in the 1960s. Adjacent Valley Forge State Park became Valley Forge National Historical Park in 1976.

In 1978, the National Park Service acquired the mansion through eminent domain, and used it to house Park employees. In 1986, Kennedy Supplee Associates LP signed a 55-year lease with the park service, restored the building, and operated it as the Kennedy-Supplee Mansion Restaurant. The private company entered Chapter 11 bankruptcy in 2005, and auctioned off its assets in April 2006. The mansion is now vacant.

References

Valley Forge
Houses on the National Register of Historic Places in Pennsylvania
Hotels in Pennsylvania
Italianate architecture in Pennsylvania
Houses completed in 1852
Houses in Montgomery County, Pennsylvania
Valley Forge National Historical Park
1852 establishments in Pennsylvania
National Register of Historic Places in Montgomery County, Pennsylvania
Upper Merion Township, Montgomery County, Pennsylvania